WQFX-FM (103.1 MHz) is a radio station licensed to Russell, Pennsylvania, the station serves the Jamestown, NY and Warren, PA areas. Owned by Media One Radio Group. The station plays a classic rock format as well as newer cuts from the 2000s. The Rock 103 airstaff includes Brian Papalia in the Morning, Kyle Lewis midday, Lee John (former morning man in the 1990s) as well as other syndicated programming such as Nights with Alice Cooper, Live in Concert, Alice Cooper Saturday, House of Hair and Floydian Slip. The station also plays local musical talent on the Homegrown show each Sunday Night. The station serves as the area's affiliate for the Cleveland Browns Radio Network and the Sabres Hockey Network.

On August 1, 2019 WQFX returned to its 1990s-era branding of "Rock 103" (having been branded as "103.1 The Fox" for most of the 21st century to that point) and repositioned itself as a mainstream/active rock station with more recent rock tracks.

History
The station went on the air as WGSI on August 15, 1984. On June 22, 1992 the station changed its call sign to WRLP, on July 18, 2000 to the current WQFX,

References

External links

QFX-FM
Radio stations established in 1984
Mainstream rock radio stations in the United States